Chalfakhreh (also Romanized as Chālfakhreh; also known as Chahār Ferqeh and Chehār Farkheh) is a village in Kuhpayeh Rural District, Nowbaran District, Saveh County, Markazi Province, Iran. At the 2006 census, its population was 65, in 29 families.

References 

Populated places in Saveh County